Maria Enrica Spacca (L'Aquila, 20 March 1986) is an Italian sprinter (400 m). She was a component of the national relay team that holds the two Italian records (outdoor and indoor) at the 4x400 m relay.

Biography
In her career she has twice won the national championships. She has 24 caps for the national team from 2006.

National records
 4x400 metres relay: 3:25.71 ( Barcelona, 1 August 2010) - with Chiara Bazzoni, Marta Milani, Libania Grenot
 4x400 metres relay indoor: 3:31.99 ( Sopot, 8 March 2014) - with Chiara Bazzoni, Marta Milani, Elena Maria Bonfanti
 4x400 metres relay indoor: 3:31.55 ( Birmingham, 4 March 2018) - current holder with Ayomide Folorunso, Raphaela Lukudo, Chiara Bazzoni

Achievements

National titles
1 win at the 400 metres at the Italian Athletics Championships (2012)
1 win at the 400 metres at the Italian Athletics Indoor Championships (2012)

See also
Italian records in athletics
Italian all-time lists - 4x400 metres hurdles

References

External links
 

1986 births
Italian female sprinters
Living people
Athletes (track and field) at the 2012 Summer Olympics
Athletes (track and field) at the 2016 Summer Olympics
Olympic athletes of Italy
People from L'Aquila
Athletics competitors of Gruppo Sportivo Forestale
Athletics competitors of Centro Sportivo Carabinieri
European Athletics Championships medalists
Mediterranean Games gold medalists for Italy
Athletes (track and field) at the 2013 Mediterranean Games
World Athletics Championships athletes for Italy
Athletics competitors of Gruppo Sportivo Esercito
Mediterranean Games medalists in athletics
Olympic female sprinters
Sportspeople from the Province of L'Aquila
20th-century Italian women
21st-century Italian women